Kevin Grund (born 14 August 1987) is a German footballer who plays for 1. FC Bocholt.

Grund made his full debut on 15 March 2010 in a 2. Bundesliga match against TSV 1860 München.

With Rot-Weiss Essen Grund won the Lower Rhine Cup in 2012, 2015 and 2016.

References

External links 
 Kevin Grund at kicker.de 
 

1987 births
Living people
German footballers
Association football midfielders
MSV Duisburg players
Rot-Weiss Essen players
1. FC Bocholt players
2. Bundesliga players
Regionalliga players
Oberliga (football) players
Sportspeople from Oberhausen
Footballers from North Rhine-Westphalia